Horst-Günter Gregor (24 July 1938 – 25 April 1995) was a German swimmer. He competed in the 1964 and 1968 Summer Olympics and won three silver medals in relay events. He also won five medals, including two gold medals, at the European championships in 1962 and 1966.

Nationally, he won 21 titles, including those in 100 m butterfly (1962, 1963 and 1966), 200 m  butterfly (1964, 1965, 1966 and 1968) and 100 m freestyle (1956–1959, 1962, 1966 and 1968).

He married the swimmer Bärbel Walter. Their son, Jens Gregor, also became a competitive swimmer. In 1961, Horst-Günter completed his studies in civil engineering. From 1979 to 1992 he was director of the State Secretariat for Physical Culture and Sports, and then chairman of the Saxon Swimming Association.

References

1938 births
1995 deaths
German male swimmers
German male freestyle swimmers
German male butterfly swimmers
Olympic swimmers of the United Team of Germany
Olympic swimmers of East Germany
Swimmers at the 1964 Summer Olympics
Swimmers at the 1968 Summer Olympics
Olympic silver medalists for the United Team of Germany
Olympic silver medalists for East Germany
People from Elbląg
Sportspeople from Warmian-Masurian Voivodeship
People from West Prussia
European Aquatics Championships medalists in swimming
Medalists at the 1968 Summer Olympics
Medalists at the 1964 Summer Olympics
Olympic silver medalists in swimming
20th-century German people